NK Rudar is a Croatian football club based in the town of Labin. They are currently competing in the Croatian Third Football League.

References

External links
NK Rudar Labin at Nogometni magazin 

Football clubs in Croatia
Football clubs in Istria County
Association football clubs established in 1945
1945 establishments in Croatia
Mining association football teams